The Gallarus Oratory (Gallarus being interpreted as either 'rocky headland' (Gall-iorrus) or 'house or shelter for foreigner(s)'  (Gall Aras) is a chapel on the Dingle Peninsula, County Kerry, Ireland. It has been presented variously as an early-Christian stone church by antiquary Charles Smith, in 1756; a 12th century Romanesque church by archaeologist Peter Harbison in 1970; a shelter for pilgrims by the same in 1994. The local tradition prevalent at the time of Charles Smith attributed it to one Griffith More, being a funerary chapel built by him or his family at their burial place.

The oratory overlooks the harbour at Ard na Caithne (formerly also called Smerwick) on the Dingle Peninsula.

Name 
There exist several interpretations as to the origin and meaning of the Irish placename Gallarus. Archaeologist Peter Harbison ventures the meaning to be something like 'the house or shelter for foreigner(s)' (Gall Aras), the said foreigners being possibly "these pilgrims that have come from outside the Peninsula."

However, according to lexicologist Pádraig Ó Siochfhradha (aka An Seabhac), the name does not refer to a foreign settlement but to a rocky headland (Gall-iorrus).

Discovery 
As the oratory is the only intact specimen of its type, it has attracted considerable attention, starting from antiquarians in the mid-18th century. The first account we have of the oratory is Charles Smith's description of 1756 in The Antient and Present State of the County of Kerry (Dublin), p. 191.

Architecture

Masonry 
The oratory is built of large cut stones from the Dingle Beds of the Upper Silurian Old Red Sandstone. Charles Smith, who discovered the edifice in 1756, described the stone as "a brown free-stone, brought from the cliffs of the sea shore, which cuts readily and is very durable."

The stones are cut on every side and end so as to fit perfectly together. They exhibit smoothly finished outside facings that follow the slant of the wall.

The edifice is usually thought to have been built without mortar, but there is evidence that even if mortar "was never visible in the wall facings it was used as a structural medium for the interior of the wall at least." A thin layer of lime mortar is used to bond the stones together and to fill in small hollows in the inner faces.

Morphology 
The oratory’s shape has been compared to that of an upturned boat because of its sloping side walls. The edifice uses corbel vaulting. The stones are positioned on each course with their edges projecting inward by a small increment as the walls rise. Besides, they are laid at a slight angle, lower on the outside than on the inside, thus allowing rainwater to run off. Both techniques can still be seen in the modern agricultural clocháns of the Dingle peninsula.

The edifice has two side walls and two end walls, sloping and converging at the top, each of one piece, playing a dual role as load-bearing wall and corbelled half-vault. Some slight sagging has occurred across the length of the northern roof slope.

It is dimly lit, with only a tiny round-headed window in the east wall, opposite the entrance door. The window splays more widely towards the inside of the wall.

The doorway is 1.67 m (5.5 ft) high. It has a flat lintel. On the inside over the lintel, two holed stones project out from the wall, possibly for the attachment of a wooden door.

Interpretations as to dates and uses 
Antiquarian Charles Smith is the originator of the claim that the building is an early Irish stone church although no historical information is available prior to 1756 regarding its use.

In 1970, archaeologist Peter Harbison argued that the oratory might have been built as late as the 12th century for a number of reasons, mainly because the east window has a rounded top made of two carved stones (not a true arch).

Harbison produced some evidence pointing to a later date and a different use: a letter by English traveller Richard Pococke who visited the oratory in 1758, two years after it was discovered by Charles Smith: "Near this building they show a grave with a head at the cross of it and call it the tomb of the Giant; the tradition is that Griffith More was buried there, & as they call'd [it] a chapel, so probably it was built by him or his family at their burial place."

In 1994 and 1995, Harbison gave up the hypothesis of a 12th century church and claimed that the placename Gallarus meant 'the house or shelter of foreigner(s)' (Gall Aras), the said "foreigner(s)" being pilgrims from outside the peninsula. However, this does not accord with lexicologist Pádraig Ó Siochfhradha (aka An Seabhac)'s translation of the name as "rocky headland" (Gall-iorrus).

Archaeological evidence 
Minor trial cuttings carried out at Gallarus in November 1970 yielded no finds or evidence of features or activity which might shed light on the period of construction and use of the oratory.

Gallery

Citations

Sources

 Moss, Rachel. Medieval c. 400—c. 1600, "Art and Architecture of Ireland" series. CT: Yale University Press, 2014. 

Buildings and structures in County Kerry
National Monuments in County Kerry
Roman Catholic chapels in the Republic of Ireland